The  is a 2.7 km light rail line owned by Iyotetsu. The line runs entirely within the city of Matsuyama, Ehime Prefecture, Japan. 

While Iyotetsu only operates light rail trains on the line, the line is legally classified as a heavy rail line.

History 
Dōgō Railway was merged with Iyotetsu in 1900, who continued to operate the line. In 1911, the line was converted into  railway and electrified.

Operations
The line is electrified with overhead lines and is single-tracked for the entire line. Two light rail services, route 1 and route 2, run on the line.

Stations
: Stations served by the heritage railway train Botchan

References

Railway lines in Japan
Rail transport in Ehime Prefecture
Railway lines opened in 1895